Terje Rafdal (born  in Hønefoss) is a Norwegian wheelchair curler.

He participated at the 2014 Winter Paralympics where Norwegian team finished on eighth place.

Wheelchair curling teams and events

References

External links 

Profile at the 2014 Winter Paralympics site (web archive)

Living people
1965 births
People from Ringerike (municipality)
Norwegian male curlers
Norwegian wheelchair curlers
Paralympic wheelchair curlers of Norway
Wheelchair curlers at the 2014 Winter Paralympics
Sportspeople from Viken (county)
21st-century Norwegian people